Diodia virginiana is a plant species in the  Rubiaceae, common name Virginia buttonweed. It is a spreading, matted perennial with opposite leaves, often mottled because of a virus that attacks the foliage. Flowers are white, cross-shaped with 4 petals. Fruits are green, often floating on water. The species can become a nuisance weed, hard to eradicate because of underground parts that remain behind when you try to pull up the plant.

Diodia virginiana is native to Cuba, Nicaragua, Mexico, Connecticut, and the south-central and southeastern United States. It is known from every state on the Gulf and Atlantic coasts from Texas to New Jersey as well as all the states in the Tennessee and Ohio River Valleys and the southern Great Plains. The species is also naturalized in Japan, Taiwan and northern California.

References

Spermacoceae
Flora of Mexico
Flora of Cuba
Flora of the Eastern United States
Flora of Nicaragua
Flora without expected TNC conservation status